The Russellville Public Library is the public library serving Russellville, Arkansas.  It is a branch of the Pope County Library system.  It is located at 116 East Third Street.

Historical building
Located next to the current library facility is the library's first building, a single-story brick building constructed with funding from the Works Progress Administration in 1936–37.  It was designed and built by O.S. Nelson, a local contractor, in the Colonial Revival style.  It housed the library until 1976.  It was listed on the National Register of Historic Places in 2000.

See also
National Register of Historic Places listings in Pope County, Arkansas

References

Libraries on the National Register of Historic Places in Arkansas
Colonial Revival architecture in Arkansas
Library buildings completed in 1937
Buildings and structures in Russellville, Arkansas
1937 establishments in Arkansas
Works Progress Administration in Arkansas